Fateh Benferdjallah (born 15 April 2001) is an Algerian freestyle wrestler. He represented Algeria at the 2019 African Games held in Rabat, Morocco and he won the silver medal in the men's freestyle 86 kg event. In the final, he lost against Ayoub Barraj of Tunisia.

Career 

In 2018, he won the silver medal in the boys' freestyle 80 kg event at the Summer Youth Olympics held in Buenos Aires, Argentina.

At the 2019 African Wrestling Championships held in Hammamet, Tunisia, he won the silver medal in the 79 kg event. In 2020, he won one of the bronze medals in the 86 kg event at the African Wrestling Championships held in Algiers, Algeria. He qualified at the 2021 African & Oceania Wrestling Olympic Qualification Tournament to represent Algeria at the 2020 Summer Olympics in Tokyo, Japan. He competed in the men's 86 kg event where he was eliminated in his first match by Stefan Reichmuth of Switzerland.

He won the gold medal in his event at the 2022 African Wrestling Championships held in El Jadida, Morocco. He lost his bronze medal match in the 86 kg event at the 2022 Mediterranean Games held in Oran, Algeria.

Major results

References

External links 

 
 
 

2001 births
Living people
Place of birth missing (living people)
Algerian male sport wrestlers
African Games silver medalists for Algeria
African Games medalists in wrestling
Competitors at the 2019 African Games
Wrestlers at the 2018 Summer Youth Olympics
African Wrestling Championships medalists
Wrestlers at the 2020 Summer Olympics
Olympic wrestlers of Algeria
Competitors at the 2022 Mediterranean Games
Mediterranean Games competitors for Algeria
21st-century Algerian people